John the Armenian was a Byzantine official and military leader. He was killed during the Vandalic War in 533.

John the Armenian commanded the Byzantine vanguard at the Battle of Ad Decimum, and killed Ammatas the brother of the Vandal king Gelimer near Carthage.  John fought in the center of the Byzantine army during the subsequent Battle of Tricamarum. After the Byzantine victory there, Belisarius tasked him with Gelimer's pursuit and gave him 200 cavalry. John almost caught up with Gelimer, but he was accidentally killed by Uliaris, one of Belisarius' bodyguards. According to Procopius, he was much loved and his death was widely mourned.

 Following the battle of Tricamaron in North Africa, December 533 AD, where the Romans were victorious against the Vandals, General Belisarius dispatched John the Armenian with two hundred horsemen in pursuit of Gelimer, and transmitted to safe custody at Carthage the Vandal treasures and captives.... John the Armenian had continued in his pursuit during five days, and was on the point of overtaking him, when he himself was slain by a random blow from one of his own soldiers. Belisarius, who was attached to him by the closest ties of friendship, shed tears at the tidings of his death, and assigned a yearly payment for the maintenance and repairs of his tomb. Yet he forgave the involuntary murderer, not only since he had taken shelter at a shrine, but because the dying words of John had avouched his innocence, and with a solemn oath adjured his comrades to refrain from his punishment. The loss of this generous officer had suspended the progress of the cavalry under his command, and favored the escape of Gelimer. Source: The Life of Belisarius, by Philip Henry Stanhope

Notes

Popular character in "Total War: Attila"

References

533 deaths
Byzantine people of Armenian descent
6th-century Byzantine military personnel
Year of birth unknown
Vandalic War
6th-century Armenian people